727 may refer to:
 Boeing 727, an airliner
 AD 727, a year
 727 BC, a year
 727 (number), a number
 "727", a song by The Box Tops from the album Cry Like a Baby
 7/27, a 2016 album by Fifth Harmony
 Area code 727, for telephones in Pinellas County, Florida
 USS Michigan (SSBN-727), a U.S. ballistic missile submarine
 Jet 727, a bus service in Aberdeen, Scotland